Sigmavirus is a genus of viruses in the family Rhabdoviridae, order Mononegavirales. Sigmaviruses naturally infect dipterans.

Taxonomy
The genus contains the following species:
 Capitata sigmavirus
 Domestica sigmavirus
 Drosophila affinis sigmavirus
 Drosophila ananassae sigmavirus
 Drosophila immigrans sigmavirus
 Drosophila melanogaster sigmavirus
 Drosophila obscura sigmavirus
 Drosophila tristis sigmavirus
 Hippoboscid sigmavirus
 Hubei sigmavirus
 Lousefly sigmavirus
 Muscina stabulans sigmavirus
 Myga sigmavirus
 Shayang sigmavirus
 Sturtevanti sigmavirus
 Wuhan sigmavirus
 Ying sigmavirus

Discovery
Drosophila melanogaster sigmavirus (DMelSV) was discovered by a group of French researchers in 1937  after they observed certain fly lines became paralysed and died on exposure to carbon dioxide (which is commonly used as an anesthetic for Drosophila). They found the carbon dioxide sensitivity was caused by an infectious agent which they named sigma, and was later found to be a rhabdovirus. More recently new sigmaviruses have been discovered in diptera of six species ; five in species of Drosophila and one in the family Muscidae.

Transmission
DMelSV, DAffSV and DObsSV are transmitted vertically by both drosophila parents (i.e. through both eggs and sperm) suggesting sigmaviruses may be a clade of vertically transmitted viruses. This unusual mode of biparental vertical transmission allows the virus to spread through host populations even if it reduces the fitness of infected hosts.

Host resistance
In Drosophila melanogaster resistance alleles in the genes ref(2)p and CHKov 1 and 2 and  have been identified that explain a large amount of the genetic variation in susceptibility to DMelSV infection.

Structure
Sigmavirions are enveloped, with bullet shaped geometries. Sigmavirus genomes are linear, around 12.6 kb in length. The genome codes for 6 proteins (3' to 5': N-P-X-M-G-L).

Life cycle
Viral replication is cytoplasmic. Entry into the host cell is achieved by attachment of the viral G glycoproteins to host receptors, which mediates clathrin-mediated endocytosis. Replication follows the negative stranded RNA virus replication model. Negative stranded RNA virus transcription, using polymerase stuttering is the method of transcription. The virus exits the host cell by budding, and  tubule-guided viral movement. Drosophilae serve as the natural host.

References

External links
 Viralzone: Sigmavirus
 ICTV

Rhabdoviridae
Virus genera